The Postmaster-General of New South Wales was a position in the government of the colony of New South Wales. This portfolio managed the postal department of the New South Wales Government and was in charge of all postal and communications services in the colony prior to the Federation of Australia, from 1835 to 1901. Upon Federation, Section 51(v) of the Constitution of Australia gave the Commonwealth exclusive power for "postal, telegraphic, telephonic, and other like services".

History
The first Postmaster of New South Wales, Isaac Nichols, was appointed by the military junta following the overthrow of Governor Bligh in the Rum Rebellion. Nichols retained the position when Governor Macquarie arrived in 1810, holding it until his death in 1819. The post office was re-organised in 1835, with postmaster James Raymond being appointed as Postmaster-General, responsible for the various post offices throughout the colony. Raymond's replacement, Francis Merewether was appointed to the Legislative Council. With the establishment of responsible government in 1856, the position reverted to a civil service office. At first the postmaster-general reported to the Colonial Secretary, then the Colonial Treasurer. In September 1865 the Governor declared that a member of the Legislative Assembly was capable of holding the office of Postmaster-General, and James Cunneen was appointed, however his appointment as a minister did not give him a seat in cabinet.

List of Postmasters-General

References

1866 establishments in Australia
1901 disestablishments in Australia
Defunct government positions of New South Wales
New South Wales